Damien Neville (born 27 January 1975) is a Bahamian retired soccer player.

Club career
Neville played for Cavalier FC in the New Providence Football League.

International career
He made his international debut for Bahamas in a March 2000 FIFA World Cup qualification match against Anguilla and has earned a total of 3 caps, scoring no goals. All games were World Cup qualifiers, his last match in March 2004 against Dominica.

References

External links
 
 

1975 births
Living people
Association football defenders
Bahamian footballers
Bahamas international footballers
Bears FC players
Cavalier FC players